Günter Böttcher (24 July 1954 – 4 October 2012) was a West German handball player who competed in the 1976 Summer Olympics.

In 1976 he was a part of the West German team which finished fourth in the Olympic tournament. He played in all six matches. In 2012, following a car accident that left him with severe injuries, Böttcher committed suicide in a rehabilitation clinic in Bad Neustadt an der Saale.

References

External links
sports-reference.com

1954 births
2012 suicides
West German male handball players
Olympic handball players of West Germany
Handball players at the 1976 Summer Olympics
Suicides in Germany
Sportspeople from Kassel